Bryan Anton Alberts (born December 29, 1994) is an American-Dutch professional basketball player. He played two seasons of college basketball with Long Beach State and three seasons in the Gonzaga University men's basketball program.

College career
Alberts arrived at Gonzaga in 2014, redshirting his first season due to injury. In April 2017, Alberts reached the NCAA Division I Championship Game with Gonzaga.

Shortly after the end of that season, Alberts announced that he planned to transfer from Gonzaga. At the time, he was expecting to earn his bachelor's degree in economics in August 2017 (and ultimately did so), making him immediately eligible to play for another NCAA Division I school under the NCAA's graduate transfer rule. Unlike most players who have taken advantage of the rule, he was eligible for two more seasons. On August 12, 2017, Alberts announced he would attend Long Beach State, where was coached by Dan Monson, who coincidentally preceded Mark Few as Gonzaga's head coach. He averaged 11.3 points per game as a junior. As a senior, Alberts averaged 10.5 points per game.

Professional career
In August 2019, Alberts signed with Djurgårdens IF Basket in Sweden. In February 2021, Alberts signed with Úrvalsdeild karla club Höttur.

In October 2021, Alberts signed with the Kongsberg Miners of the Norwegian BLNO, where he replaced Jahmal McMurray.
In January 2023, Alberts returned to Iceland and signed with Höttur.

Dutch national team
In 2015, Alberts made his debut for the Netherlands national B team. He made his debut for the Dutch national A team on August 5, 2016, in a game against Poland.

References

External links
Profile at Eurobasket.com

1994 births
Living people
American men's basketball players
American expatriate basketball people in Sweden
Basketball players from California
Dutch men's basketball players
Gonzaga Bulldogs men's basketball players
Höttur men's basketball players
Long Beach State Beach men's basketball players
People from Northridge, Los Angeles
Point guards
Kongsberg Miners players
Shooting guards
Úrvalsdeild karla (basketball) players
Djurgårdens IF Basket players